Mucherla is a village located in Kamepalli Mandal of Telangana, India. It is roughly 25 kilometers from the district headquarters of Khammam.

Villages in Khammam district